Sara Slott Petersen (born 9 April 1987) is a Danish hurdler. At the 2016 Summer Olympics, she competed in the Women's 400 metres hurdles and won a silver medal.

Competition record

1Disqualified in the semifinals

Gallery

References

Danish female hurdlers
Living people
Olympic athletes of Denmark
Athletes (track and field) at the 2012 Summer Olympics
Athletes (track and field) at the 2016 Summer Olympics
1987 births
World Athletics Championships athletes for Denmark
European Athletics Championships medalists
People from Guldborgsund Municipality
Olympic silver medalists for Denmark
Medalists at the 2016 Summer Olympics
Olympic silver medalists in athletics (track and field)
Universiade medalists in athletics (track and field)
Universiade bronze medalists for Denmark
European Games competitors for Denmark
Athletes (track and field) at the 2019 European Games
Medalists at the 2009 Summer Universiade
Competitors at the 2011 Summer Universiade
Athletes (track and field) at the 2020 Summer Olympics
Sportspeople from Region Zealand